"I Miss You" is a song performed and co-written by American R&B musician Aaron Hall, issued as the fourth single from his solo debut album The Truth. The song is his biggest hit to date on the Billboard Hot 100, peaking at #14 in 1994. The song was made in honor of his first child who died during birth. Hall wants to insist listeners of feelings and emotions about losing a spouse or child during giving birth.

Music video

Despite the song's lyrics implying that Hall's lover left him for someone else, the music video shows him in mourning over the death of his wife Charmane (played by Edith Grant) as their life is shown in flashbacks.  His wife is pregnant with their son as they prepare to welcome him into their home.  One night, Charmane wakes up in labor and gets a glass of milk, but collapses in pain.  Aaron wakes up to find she is not in bed with him and rushes to the kitchen when he hears her screams.  He rushes her to the hospital where she is taken to the Emergency Room but he is forced to wait outside.  While he is comforted by his friends, Charmane dies while giving birth to their son and Aaron is devastated.  He is later seen attending Charmane's funeral as her father gives Aaron their newborn son.  Now a widower, Aaron cares for his son and shows him a picture of Charmane and the video ends with father and son visiting the grave of Charmane.

While the music video was not directly inspired by actual events, it has been claimed that Hall did go through a real-life situation where the roles were reversed, with he and his wife's first-born son dying at birth.

The music video won at the Soul Train Awards 1995 for the Best Video of the Year.

Chart positions

Weekly charts

Year-end charts

References

External links
 

1993 songs
1994 singles
Aaron Hall (singer) songs
MCA Records singles
Songs written by Aaron Hall (singer)
Songs about heartache
Contemporary R&B ballads
1990s ballads